Pitkin High School (PHS) is a PK-12 school in the Pitkin community, an unincorporated area of Vernon Parish, Louisiana, United States. It is controlled by the Vernon Parish School Board.

History
Prior to the establishment of the school, several one and two room schoolhouses in the area educated children. They were later combined into a school called Compromise. Pitkin High was first established as a brick building facility in 1915, and it was approved as a high school on August 23, 1915. The current school building opened in 1969 and since then received renovations and additions.

Facility
The school has three wings, one for lower elementary (Pre-K and head start through 4th grade), upper elementary (grades 5-8), and high school (9-12).

Athletics
Pitkin High athletics competes in the LHSAA.

Notable alumni
James David Cain (Class of 1956), former member of both houses of the Louisiana State Legislature

References

External links

 Pitkin High School

Schools in Vernon Parish, Louisiana
Public high schools in Louisiana
Public middle schools in Louisiana
Public elementary schools in Louisiana
1915 establishments in Louisiana
Educational institutions established in 1915